The Yamuna Bank Metro Station is located on the Blue Line of the Delhi Metro. This station is a transfer point between the Noida and Vaishali branches of the Blue Line. Cross-platform transfer is provided in the same direction of travel through two island platforms. Free School Under The Bridge is situated close to the station.

The Yamuna Bank depot is situated beside the at-grade station.

Station layout

See also

List of Delhi Metro stations
Transport in Delhi
Delhi Metro Rail Corporation
Delhi Suburban Railway
List of rapid transit systems in India

References

External links

 Delhi Metro Rail Corporation Ltd. (Official site) 
 Delhi Metro Annual Reports
 
 UrbanRail.Net – descriptions of all metro systems in the world, each with a schematic map showing all stations.

Delhi Metro stations
Railway stations opened in 2009
Railway stations in East Delhi district